The Sirsa Branch, built in 1896 and originating at Indri, is a sub-branch of Sirsa branch of Western Yaumna Canal which menders through Kaithal district, Jind district, Fatehabad district and Sirsa district.

References

Canals in India